Comocritis albicapilla is a moth in the family Xyloryctidae. It was described by Sigeru Moriuti in 1974. It is found in Taiwan and Guangdong, China.

Adults are on wing in late May and early June in one generation per year.

The larvae are considered a pest, since they seriously damage the bark of litchi trees. The larvae conceal themselves under a double layer web made of silk and excrements.

References

Comocritis
Taxa named by Edward Meyrick
Moths described in 1974